Ibrahim Khalaf (born 9 July 1986) is a Jordanian judoka.

He competed at the 2016 Summer Olympics in Rio de Janeiro, in the men's 90 kg.

References

1986 births
Living people
Jordanian male judoka
Olympic judoka of Jordan
Judoka at the 2016 Summer Olympics
Judoka at the 2014 Asian Games
Asian Games competitors for Jordan
21st-century Jordanian people